The Groenkloof Nature Reserve, located adjacent to the Fountains Valley at the southern entrance to Pretoria, was the first game sanctuary in Africa. The reserve of 600 ha is managed by the Department of Nature Conservation. The National Heritage Monument is located within the reserve. It is flanked by Christina de Wit Avenue and Nelson Mandela Drive, that separate it from the Voortrekker Monument and Klapperkop Nature Reserves. In aggregate these reserves conserve some 1,400 ha of bankenveld vegetation which is threatened in Gauteng.  The reserve is open to day visitors from 5:30 to 19:00 in summer, and 7:00 to 18:00 in winter.

History
This valley on the southern outskirts of Pretoria was proclaimed a game sanctuary by President Paul Kruger on 25 February 1895. Its main purpose was to protect the shy and timid oribi, which occurred there, and other game that were being depleted by hunters. For many years however, the reserve was leased for exotic timber plantation, to supply wood and paper. A memorial wall is to be seen beside traces of the homestead of the early pioneer Lucas Bronkhorst, who settled here around 1839.

In April 2015 the head of the reserve, David Boshoff, was suspended and evicted from his council home by the Tshwane metro HR manager. The eviction came in the fifth month of a strike by the majority of the reserve's workers, who reportedly negated their agreement with management to return to work in February.

Wildlife
When the reserve was reproclaimed in 1994, the plantations were removed to allow the natural vegetation to regenerate. Open grassland occurs along the Apies valley and the higher plateau. Native trees occur at varying densities on the hillsides and in the lower valley. These include white stinkwood, hook-thorn, mountain karee, velvet bushwillow, wild pear and puzzle bush.

Since 1999 the reserve was stocked with various game species. These include zebra, blesbok, impala, kudu, blue wildebeest, red hartebeest (since 2002), giraffe (2002), sable (2003) and ostrich. Jackal, duiker and rock hyrax are also resident.

Over 120 bird species have been recorded in the reserve and the adjacent Fountains Valley. Game birds include guineafowl, Swainson's spurfowl and crested francolin. The grassy floodplain of the Apies river and its riparian vegetation provide breeding habitat for a number of weaver, bishop and widow species, while the open woodlands on the lower hill slopes provide breeding territories for bushshrike and tchagra species.

Special invertebrates of the reserve include Gunning's rock scorpion, golden-starburst baboon spider, the violin spider L. speluncarum which is endemic to caves of the Pretoria area, and the purse-web spider, Calommata transvaalica, which is severely threatened by urbanization in Gauteng.

Facilities and activities
Entrance fees differ depending on the intended activity, and the number of persons partaking. The reserve is popular with cyclists, and mountain bikers can follow a 20 km route. The three hiking trails are designated as the red (1.3/3.5 km), white (3.7 km) and yellow (10.5 km) trails. Hikers can reserve an overnight hut. Off-road enthusiasts can explore 14 km of 4x4 tracks, while game viewing is possible from a 5 km motor car route. Guided horse rides and pony rides for kids are also offered. There are two picnic areas, named Meriting and Mashupeng, and a lapa may be rented for evening get-togethers.

Gallery

See also

National Heritage Monument

References 

Nature reserves in Pretoria
Tourist attractions in Pretoria
Nature reserves in South Africa
Protected areas of Gauteng